Lumpiang shanghai (also known as Filipino spring rolls, or simply lumpia or lumpiya), is a Filipino deep-fried appetizer consisting of a mixture of giniling (ground pork) wrapped in a thin egg crêpe. Lumpiang Shanghai is regarded as the most basic type of lumpia in Filipino cuisine, and it is usually smaller and thinner than other lumpia variants.

Names and origin
Despite the name of the dish, it does not originate from Shanghai or China. It is a Filipino version of Taquito; it is named after its resemblance to the generic Chinese cuisine spring roll. The early version of the wrap is made of Tortilla from Spanish corn flour Masa until Chinese migrants opened a business in the Philippines and introduce their own version of wrap made from rice flour hence, it's called Lumpia wrapper  Lumpia itself is a combined Spanish
and Chinese Filipino influenced origin, brought over by migrants from Fujian and early Spanish colonial era. But Filipino lumpia varieties, as well as the wrappers used (which are thinner in comparison to Chinese spring roll wrappers) have been nativized.

Description

Lumpiang Shanghai is regarded as the most basic type of lumpia in Filipino cuisine. Lumpiang Shanghai can be defined by its use of giniling (ground pork) as the main stuffing. The ground pork is sautéed with finely chopped carrots, garlic, onions, shallots, and salt and pepper to taste. A small amount of it is then placed on a lumpia wrapper (a thin egg crêpe) which is then rolled around it into a thin cylinder. The ends are secured by wetting it with a bit of water or egg whites. Sometimes, the fried giniling are further moistened with raw eggs so they retain their shape better. It is then deep-fried until golden brown.

It is commonly served with agre dulce (sweet and sour) dipping sauce (which accentuates its "Chinese-ness"). It can also use other common lumpia dipping sauces like banana ketchup, sweet chili sauce, garlic mayonnaise, or vinegar with labuyo peppers and calamansi.

Lumpiang Shanghai is one of the most ubiquitous dishes served in Filipino parties, along with variations of pancit (noodles). They are commonly prepared ahead and stored in the refrigerator, and only deep-fried immediately before serving.

Variations
The basic recipe can be modified easily and is adapted to numerous variants. However, unless the variants still use ground pork as its main stuffing, the variants are usually simply referred to generically as "lumpia".

Common variations include using ground beef, ground shrimp, or shredded chicken. Other ingredients may also be added, including green peas, raisins, cheese, peppers, milk, water chestnuts, singkamas (jicama), and kintsay (Chinese celery), among others.

See also

Dinamita
Lumpiang keso
Lumpiang ubod
Empanada
Siopao

References

Further reading

Philippine cuisine
Deep fried foods
Appetizers